is a 2009 Japanese comedy-crime film, directed by Daihachi Yoshida, based on Kazumasa Yoshida's 2006 biographical novel, Kekkon Sagishi Kuhio Taisa ( "Marriage swindler Captain Kuhio"), that focuses on a real-life marriage swindler, who conned over 100 million yen (US$1.2 million) from a number of women between the 1970s and the 1990s.

The film was released in Japan on 10 October 2009.

Cast
Masato Sakai - Captain Kuhio 
Yasuko Matsuyuki - Shinobu Nagano 
Hikari Mitsushima - Haru Yasuoka 
Yuko Nakamura - Michiko Sudo 
Hirofumi Arai - Tatsuya Nagano 
Kazuya Kojima - Koichi Takahashi
Sakura Ando - Rika Kinoshita
Masaaki Uchino - Chief Fujiwara
Kanji Furutachi - Shigeru Kuroda
Reila Aphrodite
Sei Ando

Awards
At the 31st Yokohama Film Festival
 Best Actor – Masato Sakai
 Best Supporting Actress – Sakura Ando

References

External links
 

2009 films
Films directed by Daihachi Yoshida
Films about fraud
2000s Japanese films